Belvidere Township may refer to the following places in the United States:

 Belvidere Township, Boone County, Illinois
 Belvidere Township, Michigan
 Belvidere Township, Minnesota

See also 
 Belvidere (disambiguation)

Township name disambiguation pages